The following is a list of county roads in Polk County, Florida.  All county roads are maintained by the county in which they reside.

County roads in Polk County

References

FDOT Map of Polk County
FDOT GIS data, accessed January 2014

 
County